Bujaki may refer to:

 Bujaki, Podlaskie Voivodeship, a village in Poland
 Bujaki, Warmian-Masurian Voivodeship, a village in Poland
 Bujáki, Hungarian surname